is a Japanese film distributor, production company and dubbing studio based in Akasaka, Minato, Tokyo. It was founded in 1961 by Banjirō Uemura (who was also once the head of the Japanese branch of ITC Entertainment) as a dubbing house for foreign films; members of the Uemura family continue as its largest shareholders.

Anime 
 Adventures of the Little Koala
 Aikatsu Planet!
 Amon Saga
 Appleseed
 Assemble Insert
 Brave Raideen
 Garo series
 Lupin III: The Castle of Cagliostro
 Lupin the 3rd: The Mystery of Mamo
 Lupin III: Bye Bye, Lady Liberty
 Lupin III: Green vs. Red
 Mr Locomotive
 Mary and the Witch's Flower
 Mai Mai Miracle
 New Tetsujin-28
 Paranoia Agent
 Patlabor
 Patlabor: The Movie
 Patlabor 2: The Movie
 WXIII: Patlabor the Movie 3
 Ray the Animation
 Saikano
 Saikano: Another Love Song
 Sherlock Hound
 Spirited Away
 Space Adventure Cobra: The Movie
 Tachiguishi-Retsuden
 Tetsuko no Tabi
 Tweeny Witches
 The Wind Rises
 Windy Tales

Films 
 Aikatsu Planet! The Movie
 Fine, Totally Fine
 Hasami Otoko
 Lost in Translation
 Lovely Complex
 Marie Antoinette (distributed for Japanese release)
 Message from Space
 Onmyoji
 Onmyoji 2
 Shark Skin Man and Peach Hip Girl
 Somewhere (distributed for Japanese release)

Games 
 Crash Bandicoot 2: Cortex Strikes Back
 Crash Nitro Kart
 Dark Cloud
 Lupin the 3rd: Treasure of the Sorcerer King
 Mister Mosquito
 Sonic Adventure DX: Director's Cut
 Soulcalibur Legends
 SkyGunner
 Novastorm
 Metal Gear Solid 4: Guns of the Patriots
 Ultraman Powered
 Soulcalibur IV
 Sonic Generations
 Kinect Disneyland Adventures
 Final Fantasy XV
 Ni No Kuni: Wrath of the White Witch

Live-action series 
 GARO
 Aikatsu Planet!

External links 
  Tohokushinsha Film Corporation
  Tohokushinsha corporate information

Mass media companies of Japan
Anime companies
Mass media companies established in 1961
Mass media in Tokyo
Japanese dubbing studios
Japanese companies established in 1961